Brandywine Falls may refer to:

Brandywine Falls, Ohio
Brandywine Falls Provincial Park, British Columbia

See also

Brandywine (disambiguation)
Brandywine Creek (disambiguation)